The Río Concepción Group is a geologic group in Mexico. It preserves fossils dating back to the Neogene period.

See also 

 List of fossiliferous stratigraphic units in Mexico

References

External links 
 

Geologic groups of North America
Geologic formations of Mexico
Neogene Mexico